Girtys Run is a tributary of the Allegheny River located in Allegheny County in the U.S. state of Pennsylvania.

It is named after the Girty family who settled in the area. Some say it was named for John Girty. Others say it was named for Thomas Girty, brother of the famous renegade Simon Girty.

Course

Girtys Run joins the Allegheny River at the borough of Millvale.

See also

 List of rivers of Pennsylvania
 List of tributaries of the Allegheny River

References

External links

U.S. Geological Survey: PA stream gaging stations

Rivers of Pennsylvania
Tributaries of the Allegheny River
Rivers of Allegheny County, Pennsylvania